CMZ may refer to:

Central Molecular Zone, a region of the Milky Way Galaxy
Cheyenne Mountain Zoo, a zoological park in Colorado, United States
Cleveland Metroparks Zoo, a zoo in Cleveland, Ohio